A Study in Frustration: The Fletcher Henderson Story is a box set compilation surveying studio recordings of the Fletcher Henderson Orchestra from 1923 to 1938, released in 1961 on Columbia Records, CXK 85470. It initially appeared as a four-album set produced by Frank Driggs and assembled by John Hammond, both of whom also wrote the liner notes. The set was part of a Thesaurus of Classic Jazz series on Columbia which included King of the Delta Blues Singers also worked on by Hammond and Driggs and released in 1961, the first album reissue of songs by blues legend Robert Johnson.

Background
After an absence of more than a decade, John Hammond returned to work for Columbia Records in the late 1950s. He envisioned a reissue project of musicians from the 1920s and 1930s who had been mostly forgotten by the record-buying public. Working with producer and record archivist Frank Driggs, the project entitled Thesaurus of Classic Jazz included anthologies and installments devoted to individual artists. Retrieving copies of old 78 RPM records from various sources, including Driggs' personal collection, the pair assembled 64 selections to represent highlights of Henderson's output spanning 1923 to 1938.

The title of this volume, A Study in Frustration, stems from Henderson and his arrangers, Don Redman and his brother Horace Henderson among them, having invented the basic musical approach and vocabulary of the swing era in the 1920s only to have other bandleaders go on to much greater success using the Henderson formula in the 1930s. For instance, the Henderson orchestra recorded "King Porter Stomp" by Jelly Roll Morton three times to modest success: in 1928, 1932, and 1933, the latter two in arrangements by Henderson. Benny Goodman took this same tune in the Henderson arrangement and recorded it in 1935; the record itself is acknowledged as a catalyst for the swing era, and Goodman playing Henderson arrangements at the Palomar Ballroom on August 21, 1935, is generally looked upon as the launch of the big band craze that would dominate American popular music through World War II.

Content
Included are selections made famous by the Henderson orchestra, including "King Porter Stomp", "Whiteman Stomp", and "Christopher Columbus", and the first recorded composition by Coleman Hawkins, "Queer Notions". Certain selections are credited to the Club Alabam Orchestra, or the Dixie Stompers, among other band pseudonyms. Two notable recordings not included are "Down South Camp Meeting" and "Wrappin' It Up", the latter also proving a hit for the Goodman band.

Other than the Henderson brothers and Redman, arrangers included in the set are Benny Carter, Bill Challis, John Nesbitt; some are heads. Henderson sidemen would go on to success in other bands: Russell Procope, Rex Stewart, Ben Webster, and Cootie Williams with the Duke Ellington Orchestra; trombonists Benny Morton and Dicky Wells with Count Basie; and Roy Eldridge with Gene Krupa. Prominent jazz figures who passed through the orchestra were Red Allen, Louis Armstrong, Buster Bailey, Benny Carter, Coleman Hawkins, Edgar Sampson, Joe Smith, and Fats Waller. Waller allegedly sold several tunes to Henderson in exchange for a dinner of multiple hamburgers, among them "The Stampede", "Henderson Stomp", "Whiteman Stomp", and "St. Louis Shuffle", while the influence of Armstrong during his 1924–25 tenure changed the band's approach to both swing and solo work entirely. Several Henderson sidemen soloists met with an early demise – Charlie Green, Jimmy Harrison, Tommy Ladnier, Kaiser Marshall, and Bobby Stark.

All selections had been previously on 78 records by labels such as Brunswick, Columbia, Paramount, Perfect, and Vocalion. The set documents some of his first recordings as a leader in 1923, to some of his last shortly before he joined the Benny Goodman Orchestra as an arranger and some-time pianist. Like all bandleaders of the time, Henderson recorded with vocalists, but only five songs on this set feature vocals.

A Study in Frustration was reissued on Columbia/Legacy as a three compact disc box set on June 14, 1994, packaged in the longbox format duplicating in full the original liner notes from the 1961 issue. A further reissue appeared in Europe on July 5, 2011, on the Essential Jazz Classics label, with truncated notes but including ten bonus tracks covering recordings in 1934 and 1936 that had not been included in the Columbia set.

Track listing
In the compact disc versions, the song running order is the same with sides one through three comprising disc one, sides four through six comprising disc two, and sides seven and eight along with the bonus tracks comprising disc three. Arrangements by Don Redman except as noted; unknown for bonus tracks.

Side one

Side two

Side three

Side four

Side five

Side six

Side seven

Side eight

2011 compact disc reissue bonus tracks

Personnel
 Elmer Chambers, Howard Scott, Rex Stewart – cornet
 Red Allen, Louis Armstrong, Emmett Berry, Elmer Chambers, Roy Eldridge, Leora Henderson, Tommy Ladnier, Mouse Randolph, Howard Scott, Joe Smith, Russell Smith, Bobby Stark, Joe Thomas, Dick Vance – trumpet
 Fernando Arbello, Ed Cuffee, Charlie Green, Jimmy Harrison, J. C. Higginbotham, George Hunt, Keg Johnson, Claude Jones, John McConnell, Benny Morton, Teddy Nixon, Milt Robinson, George Washington, Dicky Wells, Sandy Williams, Al Wynn – trombone
 Jerry Blake – alto clarinet
 Coleman Hawkins – alto saxophone, tenor saxophone, bass saxophone, clarinet
 Don Pasqual – alto saxophone, baritone saxophone
 Don Redman – alto saxophone, clarinet, oboe
 Edgar Sampson – alto saxophone, violin
 Buster Bailey, Hilton Jefferson, Russell Procope, Omer Simeon – alto saxophone, clarinet
 Eddie Barefield, Harvey Boone, Lonnie Brown, Scoops Carry, Benny Carter, Carmelo Jejo, Budd Johnson – alto saxophone
 Chu Berry, Ben Webster, Elmer Williams – tenor saxophone
 June Cole, Ralph Escudero, John Kirby, Del Thomas – tuba
 Fletcher Henderson, Horace Henderson, Fats Waller – piano
 Charlie Dixon, Clarence Holiday – banjo
 Bernard Addison, Bob Lessey, Lawrence Lucie, Freddie White – guitar
 Israel Crosby, Elmer James, John Kirby – bass
 Sid Catlett, Walter Johnson, Kaiser Marshall, Pete Suggs – drums
 Benny Carter, Katherine Handy, Jimmy Harrison, Claude Jones, Les Reis – vocals

References

Columbia Records compilation albums
1961 compilation albums